Adam Bradley may refer to:

 Adam Bradley (politician) (born 1961), former New York State Assemblyman and former mayor of White Plains
 Adam Bradley (literary critic) (born 1974), American literary critic, professor and writer